Scott Alexander Adams (September 28, 1966 – September 16, 2013) was a professional American football player who played guard for a six-season career, in-which he played for the Minnesota Vikings, New Orleans Saints, Chicago Bears, Tampa Bay Buccaneers, and Atlanta Falcons.

Adams was born on September 28, 1966, in Lake City, Florida.

After playing in the NFL, Adams began a career in mortgage banking in Athens, Georgia. Adams died of a heart attack on September 16, 2013, aged 46, in Oconee County, Georgia.

References

External links
Just Sports Stats

1966 births
2013 deaths
American football offensive guards
Minnesota Vikings players
Chicago Bears players
New Orleans Saints players
Tampa Bay Buccaneers players
Atlanta Falcons players
Georgia Bulldogs football players
Barcelona Dragons players
People from Lake City, Florida
Players of American football from Florida
San Francisco Demons players